Okafor Uchenna Victor, popularly known as Mr Real, is a Nigerian musician from Lagos State.

Early life 
Mr Real also known as Real self was born on September 8 in Lagos State, Nigeria, to parents from Okija, Anambra State. He gained prominence after releasing the street anthem "Legbegbe". He signed a recording deal with Sony Music Entertainment Africa in 2018.

Discography

Singles

Featured

Awards and nominations

See also 
 List of Nigerian musicians

References 

Living people
Musicians from Lagos State
Nigerian male musicians
Nigerian male rappers
Year of birth missing (living people)